Luis Eduardo Musrri Saravia (born 24 December 1969 in Mallarauco) is a former Chilean footballer and current coach of San Antonio Unido.

Club career

Musrri played mostly for Universidad de Chile as well as one season in Yunnan Hongta. He was captain of "the Blue squad" for over 10 years, played alongside other players such as Marcelo Salas, Sergio Vargas, Pedro González, among others.

International career

Musrri represented Chile U20 in both the 1987 and the 1988 South American Championships as well as the 1987 FIFA World Youth Championship, where Chile reached fourth place.

Musrri was member of the Chilean squad that finished 4th at 1987 FIFA World Youth Championship. He was also selected for 1998 FIFA World Cup in France and played 28 times for Chile national football team.

Honours

Club
Universidad de Chile
 Segunda División de Chile (1): 1989
 Primera División de Chile (5): 1994, 1995, 1999, 2000, 2004–A
 Copa Chile (2): ,

References

External links

1969 births
Living people
People from Melipilla Province
Chilean people of Palestinian descent
Chilean footballers
Chile under-20 international footballers
Chile international footballers
1993 Copa América players
1998 FIFA World Cup players
Chilean Primera División players
Universidad de Chile footballers
Chinese Super League players
Yunnan Hongta players
Chilean expatriate footballers
Expatriate footballers in China
Chilean expatriate sportspeople in China
Association football midfielders
Chilean football managers
Chilean Primera División managers
Primera B de Chile managers
Segunda División Profesional de Chile managers
Deportes Melipilla managers
Club Deportivo Palestino managers
Cobresal managers
Coquimbo Unido managers
Deportes La Serena managers
Universidad de Chile managers
San Marcos de Arica managers
Deportes Iquique managers